Wilson Ugak Kumbong is a Malaysian politician who has served as the Deputy Minister in the Prime Minister's Department in charge of Sabah and Sarawak Affairs in the Pakatan Harapan (PH) administration under Prime Minister Anwar Ibrahim and Minister Armizan Mohd Ali since December 2022, Chairman of the National Institute of Occupational Safety and Health (NIOSH) since April 2020 and the Member of Parliament (MP) for Hulu Rajang since May 2013. He is a member and Vice President of the Parti Rakyat Sarawak (PRS), a component party of the Gabungan Parti Sarawak (GPS) coalition and formerly Barisan Nasional (BN) coalition. He is also cousin of Alexander Nanta Linggi, the Minister of Works and MP for Kapit.

Kumbong firstly contested and won for the Hulu Rajang seat at the 2013 general election.He retained the seat in both the 2018 and 2022 general elections, defeating Abun Sui Anyit from the People's Justice Party (PKR), a component party of then Pakatan Rakyat (PR) and PH opposition coalitions in all three elections and Geroge Lagong from the Sarawak Workers Party (SWP) in 2013. He was appointed as Chairman of NIOSH by the then Prime Minister Muhyiddin Yassin in April 2020, replacing Alice Lau Kiong Yieng from the Democratic Action Party (DAP), another component party of then PH opposition coalition. He is the first Chairman of NIOSH of the Iban ethnicity. He was appointed as Deputy Minister in the Prime Minister's Department in charge of Sabah and Sarawak Affairs by Prime Minister Anwar in December 2022, deputising for Minister Armizan Mohd Ali.

Election results

References 

Living people
Malaysian politicians
Iban people
Year of birth missing (living people)